Manuel José de Quirós (died 1765) was an 18th-century Guatemalan composer.

Life

Born in Santiago de Guatemala, present day Antigua Guatemala, towards the end of the 17th century, Quirós had a religious education while pursuing his musical apprenticeship and reaching the level of a journeyman. Having taken Franciscan orders, he was put in charge of the Franciscan press, where he served until 1738, when he was appointed chapel master of the cathedral choir and orchestra. He served in this capacity for 27 years, until his death in 1765. As chapel master, he was in charge of the education of choir boys and apprentices, besides conducting the cathedral liturgical music. Among his pupils, the most outstanding was Rafael Antonio Castellanos.

Quirós is the first musician in the New World to receive a critical review. On the occasion of the ceremonies that elevated the Bishopric of Guatemala to the rank of an Archbishopric, Quirós provided liturgical music during the nine days of celebration in November, 1745. Writer Antonio de Paz y Salgado, a high official in the Spanish colonial government, published his enthusiastic review of these musical performances two years later in Mexico City.

A considerable number of Quirós' works are contained in the archive at Guatemala Cathedral.

Works

Besides arranging a sizable amount of music sent from Spain, Lima, and Mexico City, Quirós also provided a number of original villancicos, sacred songs, and cantatas for matins of different feasts of the Catholic year:

 Cándidos cisnes, solo voice, continuo
 Oigan una xacarilla, solo voice, continuo
 Una escuela de muchachos, 4 voices, horns, violins and continuo
 Venid, venid a las aras de Dios y de Juan, solo voice, continuo
 Yo la tengo de cantar, solo voice, continuo
 Cantad, gilguerillos, 2 treble voices, continuo
 Clarines suaves, 2 treble voices, continuo
 Jesús, Jesús, y lo que subes (1743), 2 treble voices, continuo
 Hoy  que en las sacras aras, 2 voices, continuo
 Oh admirable sacramento, 2 voices, continuo
 Vagelillo que al viento, 2 voices, 2 violins, continuo
 Ay niña bella, 2 voices, continuo
 Joseph Antonio, tus dos nombres, 2 voices, continuo
 Oigan los triunfos de Domingo Santo, 2 voices, continuo
 Qué bien, chorus, continuo
 Ay Jesús, chorus, continuo
 A el pan de los cielos den adoraciones, chorus, continuo
 Lucid fragante rosa, chorus, continuo (1741)
 Un hombre Dios, 4 voices, continuo
 Luz a luz, y gracia a gracia
 El baratillo (1758)

Liturgical works on Latin texts
 Cor mundum, voice, two violins, continuo
 Liberame, voice, two violins, continuo
 Auditi meo, two choirs, continuo
 Ne recorderis, chorus, continuo
 Iod manum suam, solo voice, continuo
 Parce mihi Domine, two choirs, continuo
 Laudate pueri Dominum, SATB chorus, 2 violins, continuo
 Sanctus Deus (1760), chorus, continuo

Negrillos
 Digo a Siola Negla (1736)
 Pues que de pascuas estamos (1745)
 Amotinados los negros
 Jesuclisa Magdalena (1745)
 Vengo turo flanciquillo (1746)

References

 Dieter Lehnhoff, Creación musical en Guatemala. Guatemala City: Editorial Galería Guatemala, 2005, pp. 69–85.
 Alfred E. Lemmon, Music from Eighteenth-Century Guatemala. South Woodstock, Vermont: Plumsock Mesoamerican Studies, 1984.
 Robert M. Stevenson, "Guatemala Cathedral to 1803." Inter-American Music Review II/2 (Spring-Summer 1980):27-72.

External links
 

People from Sacatepéquez Department
Male composers
Guatemalan Baroque composers
Classical composers of church music
Guatemalan Franciscans
Year of birth unknown
1765 deaths
18th-century classical composers
18th-century male musicians
Male classical composers